Manoel Cordeiro Valença Neto or simply Valença (born March 18, 1982 in Caruaru), is a Brazilian footballer who plays as a defender. He played in the Brasileirão for Santa Cruz and Náutico.

Honours

Santa Cruz
State League: 2005
Vinausteel Tournament (Vietnam): 2003

References

External links
  PELE.NET 
 

1982 births
Living people
Brazilian footballers
Sport Club Corinthians Paulista players
Santa Cruz Futebol Clube players
Clube Náutico Capibaribe players
Association football defenders